Eliade and Eliad are surnames used by several Romanian people. They may refer to any of the following:
 Ion Heliade Rădulescu (also known as Eliade Rădulescu and Eliad) (1802-1872), writer, historian and philosopher
 Mircea Eliade, historian of religions and philosopher
 Pompiliu Eliade (1869-1914), literary historian and linguist
 Sandu Eliad, journalist and theater director

See also 
 Eliad (disambiguation)
 Heliades
 Eliade's Truth
 Eliada, Biblical figure

Romanian-language surnames